Henry Arony Ayala Martínez (born 31 January 1996) is a Honduran professional footballer who plays for Platense F.C. of Honduran Liga Nacional. He plays as a midfielder and his current club is FC Motagua of the National League of Honduras. He was born in Danlí, Honduras.

References

External links

1996 births
Living people
Honduran footballers
Lobos UPNFM players
Juticalpa F.C. players
F.C. Motagua players
Association football defenders